DCMP may refer to:

DC Motema Pembe, a football club of the Democratic Republic of the Congo
Described and Captioned Media Program
Deoxycytidine monophosphate
 Disaster Case Management Program, a federally funded program administered by the Department of Homeland Security's Federal Emergency Management Agency (FEMA).
The Dulles Corridor Metrorail Project, also known as the Silver Line (Washington Metro)